First Love, Last Rites is 1975 short-story collection by Ian McEwan.

First Love, Last Rites may also refer to:

 First Love, Last Rites (film), a 1997 adaptation of the title story of McEwan's collection
 First Love, Last Rites (musical group), a Swedish pop-rock band
 First Love Last Rites, a 1989 album by Cock Robin